R79 may refer to:

 , a destroyer of the Royal Canadian Navy
 Small nucleolar RNA R79